List of heavy metal bass guitarists.

A 
 Alver (Emperor, Dødheimsgard)
 Stefan Adika (Guns N' Roses)
 Pete Agnew (Nazareth)
 Jarkko Ahola (Teräsbetoni, Northern Kings, Dreamtale)
 Mike Alexander (Evile)
 Jared Anderson (Morbid Angel, Hate Eternal)
 Mårten Andersson (Steelheart, Lizzy Borden, George Lynch)
 Nicke Andersson (The Hellacopters, Death Breath)
 Simon Andersson (Pain of Salvation, Darkwater)
 Felipe Andreoli (Angra, Karma, Almah)
 Michael Anthony (Van Halen)
 Tom Araya (Slayer)
 Felipe Arcuri (Arkangel, Arcuri Overthrow)
 Jennifer Arroyo (Kittie, Suicide City)
 Reginald Arvizu (Korn)
 Talena Atfield (Kittie, Amphibious Assault)

B 
 Peter Baltes (Accept)
 Roger J. Beaujard
 Beefcake the Mighty (GWAR)
 Jo Bench (Bolt Thrower)
 Frank Bello (Anthrax)
 Glen Benton (Deicide)
 Jonas Björler (At the Gates, The Haunted)
 Mark Boals (Royal Hunt)
 Rachel Bolan (Skid Row)
 Trevor Bolder (Uriah Heep)
 Will Boyd (Evanescence)
 Dan Briggs (Between the Buried and Me)
 Rex Brown (Pantera, Rebel Meets Rebel)
 Steve Broy (The Mentors)
 Pat Bruders (Goatwhore)
 Olivia Newton Bundy (Marilyn Manson)
 Geoff Bergman (Curl Up and Die, Poison the Well)
 Victor Borge (TNT)
 Francis Buchholz (Scorpions)
 Nicholas Bullen (Napalm Death, Alienist)
 Adam Buszko (Hate)
 Jo Burt (Black Sabbath)
 Cliff Burton (Metallica)
 Geezer Butler (Black Sabbath)
 Michael Butler (Exodus)
 Terry Butler (Six Feet Under, Death)

C 
 Richard Cabeza (Unanimated, Dismember)
 John Campbell (Lamb of God)
 Tony Campos (Static-X)
 Richie Castellano (Blue Öyster Cult)
 Justin Chancellor (Peach, Tool)
 Tony Choy (Atheist, Cynic, Pestilence)
 Johnny Christ (Avenged Sevenfold)
 Andy Christell (Electric Boys, Hanoi Rocks)
 Greg Christian (Testament)
 Petros Christo (Firewind)
 Tim Commerford (Rage Against the Machine)
 Kelly Conlon (Death, Vital Remains)
 John Cooper (Skillet)
 Roxanne Constantin (Quo Vadis)
 Robbie Crane (Ratt)
 Juan Croucier (Ratt)
 Nocturno Culto (Darkthrone)

D 
 Piggy D. (Rob Zombie)
 Bob Daisley (Black Sabbath, Rainbow, Uriah Heep, Ozzy Osbourne, Living Loud, Gary Moore)
 Paul D'Amour (Tool)
 Sharlee D'Angelo (Arch Enemy)
 Mike D'Antonio (Killswitch Engage)
 Traa Daniels (P.O.D.)
 Rob Darken (Graveland, Lord Wind)
 Steve Dawson (Saxon)
 Johan De Farfalla (Opeth)
 Joerg Deisinger (Bonfire)
 Joey DeMaio (Manowar)
 Derek DeSantis (Twisted Method, Dope)
 John DeServio (Black Label Society)
 Cello Dias (Against All Will)
 Steve Di Giorgio (Death, Autopsy, Control Denied, Testament, Vintersorg, Iced Earth, Sebastian Bach, Charred Walls of the Damned, Obituary)
 Brad Divens (Souls at Zero)
 Trish Doan (Kittie)
 Adam Doll (The Dillinger Escape Plan)
 Mariusz Duda (Riverside)
 Adam Dutkiewicz (Killswitch Engage)

E 
 Robin Eaglestone (Cradle of Filth, Abgott)
 Leif Edling (Candlemass, Abstrakt Algebra)
 Olve Eikemo (Immortal)
 Dave Ellefson (Megadeth)
 Tomas Elofsson (Sanctification, Hypocrisy)
 Shane Embury (Napalm Death)
 Chris Estes (King Diamond)
 Kostas Exarhakis (Firewind)

F 
 Kevin Falk (Between the Buried and Me, Every Time I Die, The Material)
 Fenriz (Valhall, Darkthrone)
 Tracy Ferrie (Stryper, Michael Sweet)
 Tony Franklin (Roy Harper, Whitesnake)

G 
 Tim Gaines (Stryper)
 Galder (Dimmu Borgir)
 Kristoffer Gildenlöw (Pain of Salvation, Dial)
 Roger Glover (Deep Purple, Rainbow)
 Franz Gottschalk (Illdisposed)
 Billy Gould (Faith No More)
 Tarkan Gözübüyük (Mezarkabul)
 Joel Graham (Rise to Addiction, Evile)
 Paul Gray (Slipknot)
 Paolo Gregoletto (Trivium)
 Scott Griffin (L.A. Guns)
 Markus Grosskopf (Helloween)
 Patrice Guers (Rhapsody of Fire)
 Ivan Guilhon (Tribuzy)

H 
 Filip Hałucha (Vesania, UnSun, Rootwater)
 Tom Hamilton (Aerosmith)
 Anders Hammer (Nightrage, Dragonland)
 Felix Hanemann (Harry Slash & The Slashtones, Zebra)
 Timi Hansen (Mercyful Fate)
 Steve Harris (Iron Maiden)
 Marko Hietala (Nightwish, Tarot, Sinergy, Northern Kings)
 Ian Hill (Judas Priest)
 Sami Hinkka (Rapture, Ensiferum)
 Vinnie Hornsby (Sevendust)
 Glenn Hughes (Deep Purple)

I 
 Ihsahn (Emperor)
 Mike Inez (Alice in Chains, Ozzy Osbourne, Black Label Society, Heart)
 Infernus (Gorgoroth)
 Fredrik Isaksson (Therion, Grave)
 David Isberg (Opeth, Therion)
 Peter Iwers (In Flames)

J 
 Adrian Jackson (My Dying Bride)
 Eddie Jackson (Queensrÿche)
 Taneli Jarva (Sentenced, The Black League)
 Todd Jensen (Hardline)
 Stian Johannsen (Mayhem)
 Paulo Jr. (Sepultura)

K 
 Jari Kainulainen (Stratovarius, Killing Machine, Evergrey, Symfonia)
 Bob Kakaha (Damageplan, Hellyeah)
 Mike Kaufmann (Defiance)
 Jack Kilcoyne (Mushroomhead)
 Kim Nielsen-Parsons (Phantom Blue, Asia)
 King ov Hell (Gorgoroth)
 Grutle Kjellson (Enslaved, Darkthrone)
 Jan-Chris de Koeijer (Gorefest)
 Jukka Koskinen (Norther, Cain's Offering, Wintersun)
 Chris Kringel (Cynic)
 Kenny Kweens (Beautiful Creatures, L.A. Guns)
 Lemmy Kilmister (Motörhead)

L 
 Jean-Michel Labadie (Gojira)
 Tim Lambesis (As I Lay Dying)
 Conrad "Cronos" Lant (Venom)
 Johan Larsson (In Flames, HammerFall)
 Frédéric Leclercq (DragonForce)
 Geddy Lee (Rush)
 Michael Lepond (Symphony X, Rattlebone)
 John Levén (Europe)
 Dan Lilker (Nuclear Assault, Holy Moses)
 James LoMenzo (Ozzy Osbourne, Megadeth)
 Alessandro Lotta (Rhapsody of Fire)
 Dick Lövgren (Meshuggah)
 Phil Lynott (Thin Lizzy)

M 
 James MacDonough (Iced Earth, Megadeth, Nevermore)
 Paweł Mąciwoda (Scorpions)
 Tim McCord (Evanescence)
 Ron McGovney (Metallica, Leather Charm)
 Duff McKagan (Guns N' Roses, Velvet Revolver, Loaded)
 Sean Malone (Gordian Knot, Cynic)
 Brian Marshall (Creed, Alter Bridge)
 Ryan Martinie (Mudvayne)
 Jeff Matz (High on Fire)
 Melody Licious (Broadzilla, Gore Gore Girls)
 Memnock (Susperia)
 Marco Mendoza (Blue Murder, Thin Lizzy)
 Mark Mendoza (Twisted Sister)
 Robbie Merrill (Godsmack)
 MickDeth (Eighteen Visions, Clear)
 Asgeir Mickelson (Ihsahn, Borknagar)
 Billy Milano (Stormtroopers of Death)
 Ole Moe (Aura Noir, Immortal)
 Mooseman
 Robin Moulder (Jack Off Jill)
 Martin Motnik (Accept)
 John Moyer (Disturbed)
 William Murderface (Dethklok)
 Neil Murray (Whitesnake, Black Sabbath, Michael Schenker Group)
 John Myung (Dream Theater)

N 
 Masayoshi Yamashita (Loudness)
 Necrobutcher (Mayhem)
 Jason Newsted (Metallica, Echobrain, Flotsam and Jetsam, Voivod, Ozzy Osbourne)
 Rob Nicholson (Rob Zombie, Ozzy Osbourne)
 Johan Niemann (Evil Masquerade, Therion)

O 
 Shavo Odadjian (System of a Down)
 Orion (Behemoth)
 Wanda Ortiz (The Iron Maidens)

P 
 Hal Patino (King Diamond)
 Roger Patterson (Atheist)
 Joe Payne (Divine Heresy)
 Lee Payne (Cloven Hoof)
 György Pazdera (Pokolgép)
 Doug Pinnick (King's X)
 Csaba Pintér (Pokolgép)
 Lauri Porra (Sinergy, Stratovarius)
 Joe Preston (Thrones)
 Hugo Prinsen Geerligs (The Gathering)
 Joe Principe (Rise Against, 88 Fingers Louie)

R 
 Will Rahmer (Mortician)
 Bruno Ravel (Danger Danger)
 Jonas Reingold (Opus Atlantica, Time Requiem)
 Reyash (Vader)
 Oliver Riedel (Rammstein)
 Pascual Romero (In This Moment, Daysend)
 Share Ross (Vixen, Contraband)
 Shaun Ross (Suicidal Tendencies, Hirax, Excel)
 Lars Rosenberg (Entombed, Carbonized, Serpent, Therion)
 Steve Rowe (Mortification)

S 
 Jeanne Sagan (All That Remains)
 Troy Sanders (Mastodon)
 Rudy Sarzo (Quiet Riot, Ozzy Osbourne, Whitesnake, Dio)
 Rick Savage (Def Leppard)
 Marcel Schirmer (Destruction)
 Dirk Schlächter (Gamma Ray)
 Evan Seinfeld (Biohazard)
 Henkka Seppälä (Children of Bodom)
 Niilo Sevänen (Insomnium)
 Billy Sheehan (Talas, David Lee Roth, UFO, Mr. Big, Sons of Apollo)
 Shagrath (Dimmu Borgir)
 Rani Sharone (Stolen Babies)
 Lars Eric Si (Winds)
 Gene Simmons (Kiss)
 Melanie Sisneros (Crescent Shield)
 Nikki Sixx (Mötley Crüe)
 Tim Sköld (KMFDM, Marilyn Manson)
 Muzz Skillings (Living Colour)
 Jimmie Lee Sloas (The Imperials)
 Brendon Small (Dethklok)
 Tyler Smith (Greeley Estates, The Word Alive)
 Kyle Sokol (Rude Squad)
 Ville Sorvali (Moonsorrow)
 Paul Speckmann (Master)
 Dave Spitz (Black Sabbath, Nuclear Assault)
 Mike Starr (Alice in Chains, Sun Red Sun)
 Peter Steele (Type O Negative, Carnivore)
 Tommy Stinson (The Replacements, Guns N' Roses)
 Todd Strange (Crowbar, Down)
 Byron Stroud (Fear Factory, City of Fire)
 Dana Strum (Slaughter)
 Stein Sund (Einherjer)
 Dan Swanö (Bloodbath, Edge of Sanity, Nightingale)
 Michael Sweet (Stryper)

T 
 Taiji (X Japan, Loudness)
 Dallas Taylor (Maylene and the Sons of Disaster)
 Tchort (Emperor, Green Carnation, Einherjer)
 Jeroen Paul Thesseling (Obscura, Pestilence)
 Jan Erik Tiwaz (Borknagar, Satyricon, Emperor)
 Andrew Tompkins (Paramaecium)
 Derrick Tribbett (Twisted Method, Dope)
 Brynjard Tristan (Old Man's Child)
 Robert Trujillo (Metallica, Suicidal Tendencies, Ozzy Osbourne)

U 
 Sami Uusitalo (Finntroll, Shape of Despair)

V 
 Martin van Drunen (Pestilence, Asphyx, Bolt Thrower, With Hail of Bullets)
 Wolfgang Van Halen (Van Halen)
 Sami Vänskä (Nightwish, Nattvindens Gråt)
 Joey Vera (Fates Warning, Armored Saint, Anthrax, Engine)
 David Vincent (Soulfly, Morbid Angel)
 ICS Vortex (Dimmu Borgir)
 Vrangsinn (Carpathian Forest)

W 
 Peavy Wagner (Rage)
 Frank Watkins (Obituary, Gorgoroth)
 Pete Way (UFO)
 Alex Webster (Cannibal Corpse)
 John Wetton (Uriah Heep)
 Jeordie White (Nine Inch Nails, Marilyn Manson)
 Peter Wichers (Soilwork, Warrel Dane)
 Hank Williams III
 Liam Wilson (The Dillinger Escape Plan, Starkweather)
 Doug Wimbish (Tarja)
 Kip Winger (Winger, Alice Cooper)
 Sigurd Wongraven (Satyricon, Thorns)

Y 
 Sean Yseult (White Zombie)

Lists of guitarists
Bass guitarists by genre